The 2022–23 season is the 96th season in the history of OGC Nice and their 21st consecutive season in the top flight. The club are participating in Ligue 1, the Coupe de France, and the UEFA Europa Conference League.

Players

First-team squad

Out on loan

Transfers

In

Out

Pre-season and friendlies

Competitions

Overall record

Ligue 1

League table

Results summary

Results by round

Matches 
The league fixtures were announced on 17 June 2022.

Coupe de France

UEFA Europa Conference League

Play-off round 

The draw for the play-off round was made on 1 August 2022.

Group stage 

The draw for the group stage was held on 26 August 2022.

Knockout phase

Round of 16 
The draw for the round of 16 was held on 24 February 2023.

Quarter-finals 
The draw for the quarter-finals was held on 17 March 2023.

References

OGC Nice seasons
OGC Nice
2022–23 UEFA Europa Conference League participants seasons